Pasay City North High School - M. Dela Cruz (PCNHS-MDC) is a school in Pasay, Philippines. It was established in 1969. Pasay North High School has five campuses: M. Dela Cruz (Main), Tramo (formerly Main Campus before it was transferred to M. Dela Cruz on 2010), Basa Annex in Sangley Point (now Basa Community College) in Cavite, and Mactan Annex in Cebu. Its current main campus is the site of the former Rizal City School, purchased by then OIC-Mayor and former councilor Allan Panaligan in 2007. Since its transfer in 2010, renovations and construction of extension buildings has made through the years. Its principal is Dr. Nunilon Moreno, former instructor from nearby elementary school, Juan Sumulong Elementary School.

History 

Pasay North High School – Main Campus is presently located at Virginia St., M. Dela Cruz. Originally, the Pasay North High School was named Basa Air Base Community College. It started as a barrio high school in 1966 at Basa Air Base, Floridablanca, Pampanga. During the first year of operation, only three year levels were opened: first year to third year. The initial enrollment was 625.

In 1967, the school offered the complete four years of secondary level education. It catered to the military dependents of the Philippine Air Force enlisted personnel.

On April 23, 1969, Secretary of Education Honorable Onofre D. Corpuz,  approved the conversion of Basa Air Base Community College into a full aeronautic college. Its main campus was transferred to Nichols Air Base, Pasay. It became the Philippine Air Force of Aeronautics on January 26, 1977. The school started to accept students from the neighboring communities.

In June 1988, Republic Act. no. 6655, an act transferring the administration, supervision and operation of the Philippine Air Force College of Aeronautics-High School Department to the Division of City Schools, Pasay was implemented. Moreover, DECS Order No. 22, s. 1989; transferring to DECS the management of secondary schools of the State Colleges and Universities  SUCS and DECS Order No. 06, s. 1990 clarified and amended DECS Order No. 22, s. 1989 on Secondary Schools of the State Colleges and Universities SUCS.

On June 3, 1992, Republic Act No. 7605 – an act converting the Philippine Air Force College of Aeronautics into a State College or be known as the Philippine State College of Aeronautics and for other purposes, amending Decree No. 1078, entitled Converting the Basa Air Base Community College of Aeronautics providing for a charter for this purpose was implemented.

In October 1992, Pasay City Council Resolution No. 463, s. 1992, a resolution renaming the Philippine Air Force College of Aeronautics – High School Department to be known as Pasay City National High School was approved. This was sponsored by all members of the City Council.

In 1993, the High School Department was detached from the Philippine State College of Aeronautics. The high school moved to Tramo St., Pasay bearing the name Pasay City National High School. It has three campuses.

On August 28, 1995, The Pasay City Council approved Resolution No. 463, s. 1992, Renaming the Pasay City National High School to be officially known in all nomenclatures, designation and transactions as Pasay City North High School for all interests and purposes. And from this day where this Resolution was approved and effective, Pasay City North High School which was located at Tramo St., Pasay became the Main and the annexes of the said school adopted and used the same title of the school such as, the Pasay City North High School – Cuneta Annex which originated in Sangley, Cavite City; The Pasay City North High School - Basa Annex, the origin of the schools; and the Pasay City North High School – Mactan Annex located at Mactan Air Base, Lapu-Lapu City.

In June 2010, the Pasay City North School-Main which is  located at Tramo St., Pasay moved its main campus to where it is now, Virginia St., M. dela Cruz, Pasay. A newly constructed building with 17 classrooms housed the 1,338 students from first year to fourth year. There were also 7 function rooms for the Principal's Office, Guidance Office, Accounting, Library, Records and Supply, and for the Department Heads.

The school which originated from Basa Air Base, Floridablanca, Pampanga was founded by the late Officer, Col. Norberto P. Furagganan, Judge Advocate General Office, Philippine Air Force.

Pasay City North High School was formerly the High School Department of the Philippine Air Force College of Aeronautics located within the vicinity of the Villamor Air Base in the City of Pasay.  This semi-private institution continued what it has been started as academic provider to the original place in Basa Air Base in Pampanga and extended its role in Mactan Air Base in Cebu City.  During those times, large percentage of its clients was composed of military dependents residing inside the Villamor Air Base. 

In 1989, when Philippine Air Force College of Aeronautics was transformed into a state college, the high school department was then absorbed by the DepEd. This institution was named as the Pasay City North High School, having another annex inside the compound of Cuneta Elementary School, emerged as the 4th public secondary school in Pasay. This new public school was situated along Tramo Street in Barangay 57 Zone 8, Pasay. From Tramo where the school started to operate as the main campus, it was then transferred last 2010 at Virginia Street, M. Dela Cruz, of the same city.

References

High schools in Metro Manila
Schools in Pasay